The Heinrich Pursuit (Victor Scout) was an American fighter prototype of the 1910s. It was the only known aircraft designed by Albert S. Heinrich.

Development 
During the 19 months in which the US participated in World War I, several attempts were made to design competent single-seat fighters of original design. Among these was the Heinrich Pursuit, conceived in 1917 by Albert Heinrich and built by the Victor Aircraft Corporation. Aerodynamically clean, the Pursuit was a single-bay, unequal-span biplane, powered by a 100 hp Gnome engine.

Operational history
Two examples were ordered by the US Army Signal Corps. The first was delivered in November 1917, and underwent field testing at McCook Field, Dayton, Ohio. However, at the time US Air Force policy was to forego fighters of national design in favour of more tested foreign types. Nevertheless, the Pursuit was considered to have potential as a fighter trainer, and two more aircraft were ordered. These were powered by a more reliable 80 hp Le Rhône engine, and had a strengthened cabane and paired struts. The gross weight was reduced by 77 kg. These aircraft, called the Pursuit Mk II were delivered in early 1918 but no further development followed.

Variants 
 Mk I - fighter version (2 built)
 Mk II - lighter, faster fighter trainer version (2 built)

Units using this aircraft 

 US Army Signals Corps

Specifications (Pursuit Mk I)

See also
 Baldwin, Nassau County, New York

References 

 

1910s United States fighter aircraft
Biplanes
Rotary-engined aircraft
Aircraft first flown in 1917
Single-engined tractor aircraft